Harmonia (minor planet designation: 40 Harmonia) is a large main-belt asteroid. It was discovered by German-French astronomer Hermann Goldschmidt on March 31, 1856, and named after Harmonia, the Greek goddess of harmony. The name was chosen to mark the end of the Crimean War.

It has a cross-sectional size of 107.6 km. The spectrum of 40 Harmonia matches an S-type (silicate) in the Tholen classification system, and is similar to primitive achondrite meteorites. Photometric observations at the Organ Mesa Observatory in Las Cruces, New Mexico during 2008–09 were used to generate a light curve that showed four unequal minima and maxima per cycle. The curve shows a period of 8.909 ± 0.001 hours with a brightness variation of 0.28 ± 0.02 in magnitude. This result is compatible with previous studies.

Speckle interferometric observations carried out with the Nicholas U. Mayall Telescope at the Kitt Peak National Observatory during 1982–84 failed to discover a satellite companion. In 1988 a search for satellites or dust orbiting this asteroid was performed using the UH88 telescope at the Mauna Kea Observatories, but the effort came up empty.

References

External links 
 
 

S-type asteroids (SMASS)
S-type asteroids (Tholen)
Background asteroids
Harmonia
Harmonia
18560331